The Emiratis are the native Arab citizen population of the United Arab Emirates. Their largest concentration is in the United Arab Emirates (UAE), where there are about approximately 1.5 million Emiratis.

Formerly known as the Trucial States or Trucial Sheikhdoms, the United Arab Emirates is made up of seven emirates, each of which had a dominant or ruling family. Abu Dhabi was home to the Bani Yas tribal confederation; Dubai settled in 1833 by an offshoot of the Bani Yas, the Al Bu Falasah; Sharjah and Ras Al Khaimah are the home to the Al Qasimi or Qawasim; Ajman to the Al Na'im and Fujeirah to the Sharqiyin.

History 

The United Arab Emirates is a union of seven emirates in which their history is entwined with various empires, such as those of Portugal and the United Kingdom. Envoys from the Islamic prophet Muhammad saw the islands convert to Islam around 630 C.E.

Later in the 16th century the Portuguese would battle the then dominant force in the Persian Gulf, the Safavid dynasty, for control of the region. During the 17th century, the Ottomans took control of the islands and UAE was known as the "Pirate Coast." By the 19th century, the British Empire had taken complete control of the land then called the Trucial States. Oil was discovered in 1959. The Trucial States were under the control of the British Empire until 1971. Consequently, with weakening British control, the Trucial States became the UAE in 1971 with Ras al-Khaimah joining in 1972.

The term Emirati comes from the plural of the Arabic word emirate, with adding the suffix -i. Each emirate is ruled by a Sheikh. The Bani Yas tribe forms the basis of many clans within the UAE. Sub-clans of the Bani Yas include

 Al Bu Falah (Abu Dhabi)
 Al Bu Falasah (Dubai)

The term "Emirati" also refers to Arabs with origins in the UAE. Many modern Emirati names are derived from these tribal names or offshoots of these tribes, for instance Mazroui (from Mazari), Nuaimi (from Naim) and Al Sharqi (from Sharqiyin).

Emiratism 

Emiratism (or Emirianism) is the advocacy of Emirati national identity. The government introduced a scheme in order to promote Emiratism by giving them jobs in the private sector and encouraging them to join private sector establishments in the workplace. This is accomplished through several means, such as increasing the visibility of Emirati culture, by preserving Emirati cultural identity, and by preferentially employing Emiratis in the workforce. The latter policy is referred to as Emiratisation by the government.

Lexicology 
The word Emirati is a word derived from a combination of the word emir, which means "prince," and the Greek suffix -ate. It gradually came to mean the United Arab Emirates. The demonym Emirian has a similar root from except with the suffix -ian being added to emir. Rarer Emirian demonyms and adjectives include Emiri and Emiratian, both of which are unofficial and informal alternatives. However, due to strong tribal allegiances, many Emiratis also self-identify by their tribal affiliations. Historically, Emiratis were called Trucial Coasters or Trucials. Emiratis in ancient history were called Maganites.

National symbols 
Falcon training is one of the UAE's national symbols. These birds can be seen on the emblem of the United Arab Emirates. They were traditionally used for hunting, and trained by the Bedouin tribes. Most Emiratis view Sheikh Zayed as an essential component of Emirati nationalism, Emiratis are proud of their nation's global name associated with tourist prospects, prefer interactions with fellow nationals, most are computer literate and adult Emiratis past born in the 21st century are more likely to be bilingual There are many landmarks and sculptures in the country of teapots, water jugs and coffeemakers to symbolize the hospitality of the Emirati people. Due to the pearl-diving history of the Emirates, nautical sailing and other activities at sea are sometimes emphasized. Due to its prominence throughout Emirati history in cultivation, date fruits play an important role in Emirati life. Another national symbol is the Arabic coffee pot with the elongated thin spout called a Dallah; a sign of Emirati generosity.

Demographics 
The population of the UAE as of 2019 was 9.7 million with a minority being Emiratis. UAE nationals make up 1 million. Statistics for UAE nationals in 2018 as it follows:

Non-Emirati origin populations form the vast majority of the UAE (88.52%) and is composed of expatriates, with the largest groups hailing from South Asian countries such as India (2.62 million), Pakistan (1.21 million) and Bangladesh (706,000). There are also nationals of other GCC and Arab countries who live in the UAE. Members of other Asian communities, including Iran (454,000), the Philippines (530,000).

Languages 

Emirati Arabic is a variety of Arabic used in the UAE. Emiratis mainly speak the Emirati Arabic dialect that is part of Gulf Arabic, but some speak Shihhi Arabic and Achomi or Larestani.

Culture 

Emirati culture has been described as a blend of Eastern Arabian, Islamic, and Persian cultures, with influences from the cultures of East Africa, the Indian Subcontinent and in recent years the West.

Clothing

Men 

The traditional dress often worn by Emirati men includes, the Kandura, an ankle-length white shirt woven from wool or cotton, the Ghutra, a traditional headdress usually made from wool, it provides protection from sunburn, dust, and sand, and it is usually worn alongside the Agal which keeps it in place. This attire is particularly well-suited to the UAE's hot, dry climate.

Other traditional Emirati piece of clothing for men include:

- The Bisht, a long black cloak embroidered and decorated with silver, copper, or gold of Persian origin, it is usually worn over the Kandura at special occasions.

- The Shemagh, similar to the Ghutra but made of heavier material and is more commonly worn by the younger generation.

- The Gahfiyah, also known as Taqiyah, a traditional hat of African origin usually worn under the Ghutra.

- The Faneela, a white vest worn under the Kandura

- The Wizar, a loose piece of undergarment worn under the Kandura that is tied around the waste

- The Na'al, heelless slippers made from leather.

- The Serwaal, an alternative to the Woozar, wide and baggy trousers held up by a drawstring or an elastic belt usually worn the Kandura

- The Tarboush, a long loose tassel attached to the Kandura

Women 
The traditional dress most commonly worn by Emirati women is the Abaya, a simple, loose-over garment, usually black in color, it is often worn alongside the Shayla, a long rectangular headscarf, it usually either wrapped around the neck and tucked or pinned in place at the shoulders.

Other traditional Emirati piece of clothing for women include:

- The Gishwah, a light see through fabric that is wrapped around the face

- The Battoulah, also known as Gulf Burqa, a metallic-looking fashion mask

- The Jalabiya, also known as Kaftan, a colourful embroided dress, commonly worn during special occasions such as weddings, the dress is an important aspect of a traditional Emirati dance known as the Khaleeji folk dance.

Values 
The influence of Islamic culture on Emirati architecture, music, attire, cuisine and lifestyle are very prominent. Five times every day, Muslims are called to the prayer from the minarets of mosques which are scattered around the country.

Music and dance 

Emirati music varies to each area although most are on folklore's, some cultural dances are the horbya which well known all over the United Arab Emirates, The Ayala which is well known in Abu Dhabi and Dubai. Other music is shalat which does not involve any type of instruments.

Religion 
Islam is the largest and the official state religion of the UAE and the government follows a policy of tolerating existence of other religions, through the Ministry of Tolerance.

There are approximately 31 churches throughout the country, one Hindu temple in the region of Bur Dubai, 2 Sikh Gurudwaras,(with the biggest one located in Jebel Ali district of Dubai), and a Buddhist temple in the Al Garhoud of Dubai. Emiratis are all Muslims, approximately 90% of whom are Sunni and the remaining 10% are Shia.

The government gives freedom to people to choose their significant others.

Genetics and Racial Classification 
DNA tests of Y chromosomes from representative sample of Emiratis were analyzed for composition and frequencies of haplogroups, a plurality (45.1%) belong to Haplogroup J1-M267. Other frequent haplogroups divided between E (16.1%), R (11.6%), T (4.9%) and G (4.3%).

Racial Classification of Emiratis 

Emiratis, like any other middle easterners, are Caucasians based on a genetic study published in the European Journal of Human Genetics in nature (2019), Middle Easterners, Bedouins, Mediterraneans and Emiratis are Caucasians and closely related to Europeans and Northern Africans.

Emiratis diaspora 
Emirati ancestry, the result of emigration, also exist in other parts of the world, most notably in the Arabian Peninsula, Europe and North America.  Population estimates are seen to have a very small diaspora, mainly because the UAE provides them with more than adequate welfare benefits, removing the need to live and work in other developed countries.

See also 

 List of Emiratis
 Emiratisation

References 

 
Arabs
Ethnic groups in the Middle East